The Wife's Family (also released as My Wife's Family) is a 1931 British comedy film directed by Monty Banks and starring Gene Gerrard, Muriel Angelus, and Amy Veness. It was based on the popular stage farce by Fred Duprez. The play was subsequently filmed a further four times: in a Swedish version Mother-in-Law's Coming, in 1932; a 1933 Finnish film Voi meitä! Anoppi tulee; and British remakes in 1941 and 1956. It was produced by British International Pictures and shot at the company's Elstree Studios in Hertfordshire. The film's sets were designed by the art director John Mead.

Poster taglines: "His Mother-in-law wasn't born--she was quarried out of solid granite and could lick her weight in wildcats!"
"An inside comedy of the in-laws-the in-bads and all but ingratitude!"

Premise
Farcical confusions ensue when newlywed bride Peggy Gay overhears her husband Jack discussing the purchase of a piano, and somehow interprets what he has said to mean he is the father of an illegitimate child.

Cast
	Gene Gerrard as Jack Gay 
	Muriel Angelus as Peggy Gay 
Amy Veness  as Anabella Nagg 	
	Charles Paton as Noah Nagg 
Dodo Watts as Ima Nagg 
	Tom Helmore as Willy Nagg 
Jimmy Godden as Doc Knott 	
Molly Lamont as Sally 	
Ellen Pollock as Dolly White 	
 Geoffrey Frost as Baby

Production
BIP bought the rights to the stage farce for $7,500. The film production was very popular.

Critical reception
Allmovie wrote, "the level of humor can be assessed by the fact that the hero's unbearable mother-in-law is named Arabella Nagg."
Tasmania's The Advocate wrote in 1931, "this big talkie has been described as "Britain's Cyclone of Merriment," and packed houses have greeted it everywhere. "My Wife's Family" can hardly be included in the category of "comedies." Perhaps "super-comedy" would be an applicable term to describe the film's side-splitting qualities, but better still it would be safe to say that "My Wife's Family" has more laughs than "Rookery Nook" and "The Middle Watch" put together."

References

1931 films
1931 comedy films
1930s English-language films
British comedy films
Films directed by Monty Banks
British black-and-white films
British films based on plays
1930s British films